Ignacio Bergner (born 26 August 1984) is an Argentine field hockey player. Has a sister in Mendoza Ingrid Bergner. At the 2012 Summer Olympics, he competed for the national team in the men's tournament. Bergner plays in Royal Orée Hockey Club in Brussels.

Bergner played for the Argentina national team in the 2007 Men's Hockey Champions Challenge. He then represented Argentina in the 2007 Pan American Games, winning the silver medal. Ignacio has also won the gold medal at the 2011 Pan American Games.

References

External links
 

1984 births
Living people
Argentine male field hockey players
Field hockey players at the 2012 Summer Olympics
Olympic field hockey players of Argentina
Field hockey players at the 2011 Pan American Games
Pan American Games gold medalists for Argentina
People from Vicente López Partido
Pan American Games medalists in field hockey
Medalists at the 2011 Pan American Games
Medalists at the 2007 Pan American Games
Sportspeople from Buenos Aires Province
2010 Men's Hockey World Cup players